William H. Mishaw (died 1870) was a barber, trial justice, state senator-elect, and a rising politician in Reconstruction era South Carolina. His obituary in the Charleston Daily News described him as one of the most intelligent colored people in Charleston.

He was a captain in the militia created to protect African Americans, Randolph's Riflemen, named for Benjamin F. Randolph.

He died on election night as he won election to the office of state senator.

References

African-American people in South Carolina politics

Year of birth missing
1870 deaths